Pavel Schenk (born 27 June 1941) is a Czech former volleyball player who competed for Czechoslovakia in the 1964 Summer Olympics, in the 1968 Summer Olympics, and in the 1972 Summer Olympics.

He was born in Borotín, Blansko District.

In 1964 he was part of the Czechoslovak team which won the silver medal in the Olympic tournament. He played all nine matches.

Four years later he won the bronze medal with the Czechoslovak team in the 1968 Olympic tournament. He played six matches.

At the 1972 Games he was a member of the Czechoslovak team which finished sixth in the Olympic tournament. He played five matches.

External links
 
 

1941 births
Living people
Czech men's volleyball players
Czechoslovak men's volleyball players
Olympic volleyball players of Czechoslovakia
Volleyball players at the 1964 Summer Olympics
Volleyball players at the 1968 Summer Olympics
Volleyball players at the 1972 Summer Olympics
Olympic silver medalists for Czechoslovakia
Olympic bronze medalists for Czechoslovakia
Olympic medalists in volleyball
Medalists at the 1968 Summer Olympics
Medalists at the 1964 Summer Olympics